Elk River is a city in Sherburne County, Minnesota, United States, approximately 34 miles northwest of Minneapolis. It is situated at the confluence of the Mississippi and Elk Rivers. The population was 25,835 at the 2020 census, making Elk River the second largest city in the Central Minnesota region after St. Cloud. It is the county seat. U.S. Highways 10 and 169 and State Highway 101 are three of the main routes in Elk River, and a station on the Northstar Commuter Rail line to downtown Minneapolis is located in the city. Elk River is located 33.2 miles northwest of Minneapolis and 37.4 miles southeast of St. Cloud.

History

The hardwood-forested hills in which Elk River is situated was pushed up by the last glacier that advanced across Minnesota. These hills are made up of coarse materials which is the reason gravel mining is so prevalent in Elk River, and also the reason much of the area is not considered good farmland for culture and agriculture use.

To the south of Elk River lies the prairie. This natural boundary between the prairie and woods was also a boundary between Indian nations. Two battles between the Dakota and Ojibwe took place where the Elk River meets the Mississippi in 1772 and 1773.

Rivers

Zebulon Pike passed through the area on his 1805 exploration of the Upper Mississippi River and named the Elk River after the herds of elk he saw in the area. David Frederic Faribault, son of French-Canadian fur trader Jean-Baptiste Faribault built a trading post near the conjunction of the Elk and Mississippi Rivers in 1846, which he later sold, in 1848, to H.M. Rice and S.P. Folsom. Folsom moved his family to the place and built a log cabin. French fur trader and guide Pierre Bottineau bought the post and cabin from Folsom. The trading post stood on a bluff just north of the present day bridge across the Elk River on main street. Bottineau also built a hotel in 1850 on the bank of the Mississippi about a half mile below the mouth of the Elk.  The two rivers and the Red River Trail, which passed nearby, made this area a good location for commerce.

Silas Lane opened up a farm near the old trading post site, making his claim in section 33 in 1850. A large number of early settlers came from Maine and nearly all of them were experts in lumbering. In 1851, Ard Godfrey and John C. Jamieson, a native of Orono, Maine, saw the potential of the water power of the Elk River and purchased the claim from Lane. They built a dam and a sawmill. Their dam created the first lobe of Lake Orono (called the Mill Pond), which extended from the present day dam to Orono Cemetery Point. In 1855, the area by the dam was platted and the town of Orono (known as Upper Town) was created.

In the latter half of the 19th century, agriculture and dairy farming replaced lumber as the base of Elk River's economy. Grist mills and a starch factory, which took advantage of the potato fields to the west, were built.

The Orono-Elk River area continued to grow until by 1860 it had reached a population of 723 people. These early settlers typically came from New England. Elk River's population continued to grow following a slow period caused by the civil war. The majority of people moving to Elk River by that time were from Northern Europe.

The village of Elk River was platted in 1865, replatted in 1868, and when incorporated in the winter of 1880–1881, included both Orono and Elk River. By 1870, Elk River swelled to a population of 2,050 and became the county seat in 1872. Around this same time, the railroads replaced the rivers as the main focus of transportation and the Lower Town (the present day historic downtown area) replaced Upper Town as the focus of commerce.

The Orono Dam was destroyed by an ice storm in 1912, but hydropower gave a new incentive to dam the Elk River in 1915. This new dam created the four lobes of Lake Orono as we know it today. In 1916, the Village of Elk River received electricity for the first time. The entire township of Elk River would not get electricity until after World War II.

Road transportation
Charles Babcock, a native son of Elk River and the first Commissioner of Highways for the state, had a visionary plan to "get Minnesota out of the mud." His plan to create a network of paved roads became a model for the rest of the nation and the Jefferson Highway (now Highway 10) became one of the first paved roads in the state. Highway 10 used to cross the Elk River over the dam bridge, but was rerouted to its present location shortly after World War II.

Jackson Avenue used to be Highway 169. For years, the intersection of this road and Highway 10 was the only one with a stoplight in Elk River and on major travel weekends, traffic would back up halfway to Anoka. Work on Highway 169 to bypass Elk River began in 1961. Work on a new route for Highway 101 between Rogers and Elk River began in 1968.

In 1974, the Village of Elk River changed to the City of Elk River. In 1978, the City of Elk River and the township of Elk River were consolidated to create one unit known as the City of Elk River as it exists today. The result was one of the largest land-based cities in the state of Minnesota, at 44 square miles.

Besides transportation, energy has always played a significant role in shaping Elk River. The first rural nuclear power plant in the United States went online in 1960 as Great River Energy's (GRE) site in Elk River. It was meant only as a demonstration site and was dismantled after several successful years of operation.

Energy City
In the late 1980s, GRE's power plant was converted to burn refuse-derived fuel. This innovative source of energy was one factor that helped Elk River receive the designation of "Energy City" by the Minnesota Environmental Initiative in October 1997. As Energy City, Minnesota's energy industries demonstrate cutting edge renewable and energy efficient technologies in Elk River.

By the 1990s, Elk River and Sherburne County were in one of the fastest growing corridors in the state and in the country. This population growth and the area's high commuter rate factored into the ultimate approval and implementation of the Northstar Commuter Rail service from Minneapolis to Big Lake, which began service on November 16, 2009.

Attractions
The City of Elk River offers many amenities to its residents, offering a small-town feel but close enough to the Twin Cities and St. Cloud.

Handke Stadium
Also known as the Elkhi Stadium, it started its construction in 1921. It became a playing field for football and hockey rink in the winter. In 1939 workers built steps, stone retaining walls and a warming house with a fireplace. After a couple years, the Handke Stadium began to deteriorate and had to be shut down. The Elk River Rotary Club fundraised enough money that in 2000 they repaired the stadium. New warming house, wiring and the steps and stone have either been replaced or repaired. Since being newly reconstructed it had been included into the National Register of Historic Places.

Art

Downtown Murals
In 1991, K.S. "Bud" Houlton commissioned the painting of the first downtown mural. The mural, depicting the former buildings on the south side of Main Street circa 1960, captured the spirit when downtown was the center of the business community. Mr. Houlton had a great interest in local history and created the mural as a gift to the community. Mr. Houlton's son, John, clearly remembers the businesses depicted in the painting. He stated the bakery and barber shop are still in operation today, but the business names have changed. The artist is Michael Russell.

In 2001, the Three Rivers Community Theater applied for a grant to assist in providing monies towards the painting of a mural of an artistic and historical significance on the building adjacent to the River's Edge Park, located at the intersection of Main Street and Jackson Avenue. This effort to have a mural painted was inspired by numerous community members, business owners, and public entities interested in downtown beautification and continuing to recognize the arts community of Elk River. This project enhanced the social, cultural, and leisure of downtown Elk River. The desire was to draw attention to the Mississippi River for its beauty and solace as well as its historical significance to Elk River. Local artist Frank Gosiak created and painted the mural.'

Whimsical Windmill
The "Whimsical Windmill" is the art piece that was chosen in the Elk River Powered by Nature Art Contest.  Artist Carl Zachmann from Fergus Falls created the piece in reminiscence of the windmills on farms that pump water.  The gears and representing colors stand for the rivers, the confluence of both rivers, forest and lumber that helped build Elk River, and a reminder of the prairie that help the area's agriculture to flourish.  The base of the windmill is designed to represent the river.  The windmill is located on the grounds of the Elk River Library.

Art
Elk River has always been a town energized by its local artists, showcasing talented residents. The Elk River Area Arts Alliance, founded in 1989, is a nonprofit organization that works with area businesses, government agencies, local schools, other arts organizations, and individual artists to provide quality arts experiences for area residents. The Arts Alliance is known for ArtSoup, Strings for Youth, and Arts in Harmony. They provide access to professional concerts, theater, dance, and visual arts experiences through Arts Explorations motor coach trips. The Arts Alliance also provides various workshops and have a family and arts center with attractive community gathering space, classrooms, studios, gallery. They are also able to offer professional concerts in a state-of-the-art theater at Elk River Area High School.

Furniture and Things Community Event Center
Completed in 2019, the Furniture and Things Community Event Center is located near the Elk River High School and offers skating to youth and adults, as well as a Spring and Fall Arts and Craft Fair, an arena walking track, and much more.

ERX Motor Park
ERX Motor Park is an all-season motorsports and events facility located in Elk River, MN, off of US Highway 169. It houses Grassroots Snocross, Beatercross, cross country snowmobile and dirt bike racing, off-road, concerts, corporate events, monster trucks, rodeo and more.

Golf courses
The city boasts two golf courses: Pinewood Golf Course, a municipal nine-hole course, and Elk River Country Club, an 18-hole course.

Parks
 
The City of Elk River has 41 parks and one conservation area with a total of 1,388 maintained acres. These parks and open areas are in various stages of development. Check out a full park directory available on the city's website here: https://www.elkrivermn.gov/parks.

Public library
The Elk River Public Library is part of the Great River Regional Library and it is a LEED Gold Certified building.

Transportation
The City of Elk River is a busy city when it comes to traffic, particularly on weekends in the summer and fall as vacationers and hunters head north to their cabins.

U.S. Highways 10 and 169 have their northwest juncture in Elk River, with the two highways concurrent for 12 miles until Anoka to the southeast.  U.S. 10 continues northwesterly toward St. Cloud, and U.S. 169 continues due north toward Mille Lacs Lake from Elk River.

Minnesota Highway 101 has its northern terminus at the U.S. 10 / U.S. 169 split in Elk River and is a major route connecting these highways with Interstate 94, seven miles to the south.

Many residents of Elk River commute to the Twin Cities daily for work; it is roughly a 40-mile drive to Minneapolis. Elk River Station is served by the Northstar Commuter Rail line connecting the northwest suburbs and downtown Minneapolis; the line opened in November 2009.

For travel within the city, there is an on-demand transportation service available from Tri-County Action Program for residents of Sherburne County.

Major highways
The following routes are located within the city of Elk River.

  U.S. Highway 10
  U.S. Highway 169
  Minnesota State Highway 101

Education
Elk River is in the Elk River School District.

Elk River is served by two grade 9-12 high schools, Elk River High School and  Ivan Sand Community High School, and one grade 6-12 school, Spectrum High School, two middle schools, Salk Middle School and VandenBerge Middle School, both of which serve grade 6-8. Lincoln Elementary, Parker Elementary, Meadowvale Elementary and Twin Lakes Elementary serve kindergarten to grade 5.
Elk River is also served by a private school, St. Andrew's Catholic School, which currently teaches Kindergarten through grade 5 and is paid for mostly by parishioners.

Geography
The city's latitude and longitude are 45.313601° N and 93.5814° W.

Elk River is bordered to the south by the Mississippi River. The Elk River meanders through Sherburne County to its terminus at the Mississippi River through the western side of Elk River, pausing at Lake Orono, created by a dam not far from its conjunction with the Mississippi River.

Climate
Elk River has a hot summer humid continental climate (Köppen Dfa).

Demographics

2010 census
As of the census of 2010, there were 22,974 people, 8,080 households, and 6,050 families residing in the city. The racial makeup of the city was 93.4% White, 1.8% African American, 0.4% Native American, 1.7% Asian, 0.7% from other races, and 1.9% from two or more races. Hispanic or Latino of any race were 3.1% of the population.

There were 8,080 households, of which 42.1% had children under the age of 18 living with them, 61.1% were married couples living together, 9.5% had a female householder with no husband present, 4.3% had a male householder with no wife present, and 25.1% were non-families. 19.6% of all households were made up of individuals, and 7.6% had someone living alone who was 65 years of age or older. The average household size was 2.76 and the average family size was 3.18.

The median age in the city was 34.9 years. 28.5% of residents were under the age of 18; 7.7% were between the ages of 18 and 24; 29.5% were from 25 to 44; 24.9% were from 45 to 64; and 9.3% were 65 years of age or older. The gender makeup of the city was 50.2% male and 49.8% female.

2000 census
As of the census of 2000, there were 16,447 people, 5,664 households, and 4,400 families residing in the city. The racial makeup of the city was 97.18% White, 0.43% African American, 0.37% Native American, 0.49% Asian, 0.01% Pacific Islander, 0.48% from other races, and 1.02% from two or more races. Hispanic or Latino of any race were 1.33% of the population. 39.0% were of German, 14.7% Norwegian, 7.7% Swedish and 6.8% Irish ancestry.

There were 5,664 households, out of which 45.5% had children under the age of 18 living with them, 64.7% were married couples living together, 9.2% had a female householder with no husband present, and 22.3% were non-families. 17.2% of all households were made up of individuals, and 7.0% had someone living alone who was 65 years of age or older.  The average household size was 2.85 and the average family size was 3.24.

In the city, the population was spread out, with 31.3% under the age of 18, 8.5% from 18 to 24, 33.9% from 25 to 44, 18.3% from 45 to 64, and 8.0% who were 65 years of age or older.  The median age was 32 years. For every 100 females, there were 100.9 males.  For every 100 females age 18 and over, there were 96.8 males.

The median income for a household in the city was $58,114, and the median income for a family was $65,471. Males had a median income of $43,230 versus $30,023 for females. The per capita income for the city was $21,808.  About 2.5% of families and 3.2% of the population were below the poverty line, including 2.9% of those under age 18 and 4.6% of those age 65 or over.

Notable people
 Dorothy Brady – Mathematician and economist, former professor of economics at Wharton School of the University of Pennsylvania, and a Fellow of the American Statistical Association
Margaret Frazer, historical novelist (1946-2013)
 Dan Hinote – Former professional ice hockey player for the Colorado Avalanche, Modo Hockey Club (Swedish Elitserien), and St. Louis Blues
Bill Hudson  - TV Journalist for WCCO-TV
 Stephanie Klinzing – Minnesota state legislator and former mayor of Elk River
 Mark Larson - Prominent Aikido instructor who learned at the birthplace of Aikido in Iwama, Ibaraki, Japan. 
 Paul Martin – Former professional  ice hockey player for the San Jose Sharks, New Jersey Devils, and the Pittsburgh Penguins
 Dave Mordal – Contestant on the first and third seasons of Last Comic Standing and host of the Discovery Channel's Wreckreation Nation
 Nancy Mudge – Former professional baseball player in the AAGPBL
 Joel Otto – Former professional ice hockey player for the Calgary Flames and the Philadelphia Flyers (NHL)
 Nate Prosser – Professional hockey player for the Minnesota Wild (NHL)
 Laura Ryan – International competitive diver

References

External links

 City website
 Elk River Chamber of Commerce
 Minnesota Historical Society: Oliver H. Kelley Farm
 Friends of the Kelley Farm 
 Elk River Area School District

Cities in Minnesota
Cities in Sherburne County, Minnesota
Minnesota populated places on the Mississippi River
County seats in Minnesota